Commodore (Cmdre) is a Canadian Forces rank used by commissioned officers of the Royal Canadian Navy. Brigadier-general is the equivalent rank in the Canadian Army and Royal Canadian Air Force.

It is the lowest general/flag officer rank, senior to a naval Captain (colonel in Canadian Army or Air Force), and junior to a rear admiral (major general).

Insignia 
A wide gold band with executive curl is displayed on each sleeve of the service dress and mess dress. Shoulder boards and rank slip-ons have a single maple leaf, above which is a crossed sabre and baton surmounted by St Edward's Crown.

See also
 Canadian Forces ranks and insignia

References

Navy of Canada
Military ranks of Canada
Military insignia
One-star officers